Asuo (also called Asong 阿松) is a Southern Loloish language of Yunnan, China. Asuo is spoken in Jiangcheng Hani and Yi Autonomous County, Yuanjiang Hani, Yi and Dai Autonomous County, Lüchun County, Jinping Miao, Yao, and Dai Autonomous County, and Yuanyang County, Yunnan.

Lefèvre-Pontalis (1892) reports the presence of Asong in Poufang, Lai Chau province, Vietnam, and provides a word list for Asong as well.

References

You Weiqiong [尤伟琼]. 2013. Classifying ethnic groups of Yunnan [云南民族识别研究]. Beijing: Nationalities Press [民族出版社].

Southern Loloish languages
Languages of Yunnan